Muleskinner is the eponymous debut album by the progressive bluegrass group Muleskinner, recorded at the Record Plant, Hollywood, California, March 27 through April 14, 1973, and released later that year. It is their only studio album. The album was re-released by Ridge Runner in 1978 and re-issued on a compact disc in 1994 under the title A Potpourri of Bluegrass Jam, which was a banner on the front cover of the original album release.

Muleskinner reunited David Grisman and Peter Rowan, who had played together in the band, Earth Opera. They along with bassist John Kahn would go on to form Old & In the Way after Muleskinner disbanded.

Shortly after the release of the album guitarist Clarence White  died, and the album was subsequently dedicated to him.
The band released a live album in 1998 (recorded in 1973) and re-united for a couple of one-off performances.

Track listing
 "Muleskinner Blues" (Rodgers, Vaughn) – 3:16
 "Blue And Lonesome" (Jacobs) – 3:18
 "Footprints In The Snow" (Miller, Elliott) – 3:34
 "Dark Hollow" (Browning) – 2:48
 "Whitehouse Blues" (Traditional arr. Greene) – 2:18
 "Opus 57 in G Minor" (Grisman) – 2:26
 "Runways Of The Moon" (Roberts, Rowan) – 4:23
 "Roanoke" (Ahr) – 1:49
 "Rain and Snow" (trad., arr. Rowan) – 4:10
 "Soldier's Joy" (trad., arr. White) – 2:15
 "Blue Mule" (Rowan) – 4:28

Personnel
 Peter Rowan – vocals, guitar
 Bill Keith – banjo, pedal steel
 Clarence White – acoustic guitar, electric guitar, vocals
 Richard Greene – violin, vocals
 David Grisman – mandolin, vocals
 John Guerin – drums
 John Kahn – bass

References

1973 debut albums
Peter Rowan albums
David Grisman albums
Warner Records albums